This is a list of franchise records for the Boston Pride of the Premier Hockey Federation.

Regular season

All players

Points

Goals

Assists

Games played

Penalty minutes

Game-winning goals

Power-play goals

Short-handed goals

Defensemen

Points

Goaltenders

Games played

Wins

*minimum of 60 minutes played

Shutouts

*minimum of 60 minutes played

Goals against average

*minimum of 60 minutes played

Save percentage

*minimum of 60 minutes played

Playoffs

All players

Points

Goals

Assists

Games played

Penalty minutes

Game-winning goals

Power play goals

Short-handed goals

Defensemen

Points

Goaltenders

Games played

Wins

Goals against average

Save percentage

Shutouts

Franchise records

Franchise single season

Franchise single game

Franchise streaks

Streaks

Individual records

Career leaders 

*Minimum of 60 minutes played for a goaltender

Single season leaders 

*Minimum of 60 minutes played for a goaltender

Individual single game leaders 

¹ NWHL record

See also
 PHF awards
 List of Buffalo Beauts records
 List of Connecticut Whale (PHF) records
 List of Minnesota Whitecaps records
 List of PHF records (individual)

References

Premier Hockey Federation lists